Hogue Run is a small tributary of Slippery Rock Creek in western Pennsylvania.  The stream rises in northwestern Butler County and flows northeast then north entering Slippery Rock Creek at Camp Crestview. The watershed is roughly 34% agricultural, 61% forested and the rest is other uses.

See also 
 List of rivers of Pennsylvania

References

Rivers of Pennsylvania
Tributaries of the Beaver River
Rivers of Butler County, Pennsylvania